Endre (Andreas) Steiner (27 June 1901 – 29 December 1944) was a Hungarian chess player, born in Budapest.

Endre Steiner played for Hungary in five official and one unofficial Chess Olympiads.
 In 1927, he played at first reserve board at 1st Chess Olympiad in London (+6 –2 =5). 
 In 1928, he played at second board at 2nd Chess Olympiad in The Hague (+10 –3 =3). 
 In 1930, he played at first reserve board at 3rd Chess Olympiad in Hamburg (+7 –2 =5). 
 In 1931, he played at first board at 4th Chess Olympiad in Prague (+5 –7 =3). 
 In 1936, he played at third board at the unofficial Olympiad in Munich (+11 –6 =1). 
 In 1937, he played at third board at 7th Chess Olympiad in Stockholm (+12 –1 =5). 
He thrice won the team gold medal (1927, 1928 and 1936), twice won a team silver medal (1930 and 1937), and once won an individual silver medal (1937).

He died in a Nazi concentration camp near Budapest on 29 December 1944.

Endre was the elder brother of Lajos Steiner.

See also
 List of Jewish chess players

References

External links 
 

1901 births
1944 deaths
Hungarian Jews
Hungarian chess players
Chess Olympiad competitors
Jewish chess players
20th-century chess players
Hungarian people who died in Nazi concentration camps
Hungarian civilians killed in World War II
Hungarian Jews who died in the Holocaust